Darak or Derak in Iran may refer to:

Darak, Khuzestan (دارك - Dārak)
Darak, Qazvin (درك - Darak)
Derak Rural District, in Fars Province
Darak, Sistan and Baluchestan (درك - Darak), beaches in Sistan and Baluchestan
Mount Derak, a sedimentary rock mountain located in Shiraz, Fars